Joanino Beviláqua (7 June 1912 – 26 May 1999), known as just Joanino, was a Brazilian footballer. He played in one match for the Brazil national football team in 1942. He was also part of Brazil's squad for the 1942 South American Championship.

References

External links
 

1912 births
1999 deaths
Brazilian footballers
Brazil international footballers
Place of birth missing
Association footballers not categorized by position